Te Keepa Hone Mewett (born 10 May 1987 in New Zealand) is a New Zealand rugby union player who played for  and  in the National Provincial Championship. His playing position is lock.

Reference list

External links
itsrugby.co.uk profile

1987 births
New Zealand rugby union players
Living people
Rugby union locks